Sheffield Attercliffe was a parliamentary constituency in the City of Sheffield. It was created at the 1885 general election and abolished at the 2010 general election, when it was replaced by a new Sheffield South East constituency.

Boundaries
1885–1918: The Municipal Borough of Sheffield wards of Attercliffe and Park, and the civil parish of Heeley.

1918–1950: The County Borough of Sheffield wards of Attercliffe and Darnall.

1950–1955: The County Borough of Sheffield wards of Attercliffe, Darnall, and Handsworth.

1955–1974: The County Borough of Sheffield wards of Attercliffe, Darnall, Handsworth, and Tinsley.

1974–1983: The County Borough of Sheffield wards of Attercliffe, Birley, Darnall, Handsworth, and Mosborough.

1983–2010: The City of Sheffield wards of Beighton, Birley, Darnall, Handsworth, Mosborough, Richmond and Woodhouse.

Note: there were council ward boundary changes in 2004, which abolished Handsworth and created Beighton, Mosborough, Richmond and Woodhouse.

From 1997, Sheffield Attercliffe covered much of the east and south-east of the city. It bordered the constituencies of North East Derbyshire, Rotherham, Rother Valley, Sheffield Brightside, Sheffield Central and Sheffield Heeley.

History 
Sheffield Attercliffe constituency was created when the two-seat Sheffield constituency was split into five single-member seats in 1885.

Members of Parliament

Elections

Elections in the 2000s

Elections in the 1990s

Elections in the 1980s

Elections in the 1970s

Elections in the 1960s

Elections in the 1950s

Elections in the 1940s

The 1944 by-election was called following the resignation of Cecil Henry Wilson on 9 February. John Burns Hynd of the Labour Party was elected unopposed.

Elections in the 1930s

Elections in the 1920s

Elections in the 1910s

Elections in the 1900s

Elections in the 1890s

This by-election was called due to the resignation on 26 June of Bernard John Seymour Coleridge following his inheritance of the title of Baron Coleridge.

Elections in the 1880s

See also 
 List of parliamentary constituencies in South Yorkshire

Sources
BBC News, Election 2005
BBC News, Vote 2001
Guardian Unlimited Politics

Politicsresources.net - Official Web Site ✔  (Election results from 1951 to the present)
F. W. S. Craig, British Parliamentary Election Results 1918 - 1949
F. W. S. Craig, British Parliamentary Election Results 1950 - 1970
Sheffield General Election Results 1945 - 2001, Sheffield City Council

References

Attercliffe
Attercliffe
Constituencies of the Parliament of the United Kingdom established in 1885
Constituencies of the Parliament of the United Kingdom disestablished in 2010